Bryn is an electoral ward in Wigan, England. It forms part of Wigan Metropolitan Borough Council, as well as the parliamentary constituency of Makerfield and the town of Ashton in Makerfield.

Councillors 
The ward is represented by three councillors: Sam Flemming (Lab), Steve Jones (Ind) and Sylvia Wilkinson (Ind).

Elections

Elections in the 2020s

References

Wigan Metropolitan Borough Council Wards